The Kanadi kingfish (Scomberomorus plurilineatus) is a species of ray-finned bony fish in the family Scombridae, the mackerel family. Also known as the Kanadi seerfish, queen mackerel, or spotted mackerel, it is found in subtropical waters of the western Indian Ocean, Seychelles, Kenya and Zanzibar to South Africa and along the west coast of Madagascar. They feed mainly on small fishes such as anchovies and clupeids, squids, and mantis shrimps.

References

Scombridae
Taxa named by Pierre Fourmanoir
Fish described in 1966
Scomberomorus